Craig Bruce Reucassel is an Australian television and radio comedian. He is best known for being a member of satirical team The Chaser. He hosted the Australian version of Balls of Steel, which premiered in April 2011. Since 2013, Reucassel and fellow Chaser Julian Morrow have been main presenters on the ABC program The Checkout. In 2017, Reucassel presented the four-part ABC TV series War on Waste which focused on clothing and food waste in Australia, its environmental impacts and what can be done to help reduce waste. This was followed by a second series, Fight For Planet A: Our Climate Challenge in 2018, which focused on the use of plastics, and particularly 'single-use' plastics such as straws. Alongside publishing the program, Big Weather And How To Survive It (2020): an exploration of how to survive extreme weather events, Reucassel directed the two-part ABC TV series Big Deal (2021). The series presented by actor Christian Van Vuuren, investigated the influence of lobbying and donations on Australia's political system.

Early life 
Reucassel was born in South Africa and moved to Adelaide at a young age with his parents. There, he attended Semaphore Park Primary School. The family relocated to the Southern Highlands of New South Wales, and Reucassel attended Bowral Public School and Bowral High School. In 1993 he represented Bowral High School at The Sydney Morning Herald Plain English Speaking competition. Also attending, representing St Aloysius' College, was future Chaser member Julian Morrow.

Reucassel attended the University of Sydney, and completed a Bachelor of Economics (Social Science) degree in 1999 and graduated with a Bachelor of Laws degree in 2002. With a strong dedication to extracurricular activities on campus, Reucassel ran the arts revue and the canoe club, and was an editor of the student newspaper Honi Soit. He also debated at several World Universities Debating Championships, ranking 30th in the World at Manila in 1999 and 167th in Glasgow in 2001. In 2000 he competed in the Philip C. Jessup Cup international law mooting competition, his team winning the Australian rounds. He graduated from the Sydney Law School, along with Chaser colleagues Julian Morrow, Dominic Knight and Chas Licciardello.

Triple J 
In 2004 and 2005, Reucassel co-hosted the drive-time radio show Today Today on Triple J with fellow Chaser Chris Taylor. The pair returned with their Sunday afternoon show Bloody Sunday to do relief shifts in mid-2006 and summer 2006–07.

The Chaser's War on Everything 

Reucassel was a founding member of the satirical multi-media group The Chaser team, and worked to produce their satirical newspaper, as well as television shows on ABC TV including The Election Chaser, CNNNN, The Chaser Decides  and The Chaser's War on Everything.
He has been one of the main presenters on The War since the pilot episode.
He and his wife Keisha have three children together, and their son Ollie has appeared on some of the sketches on The War. Reucassel was often the one selected to confront former Prime Minister John Howard on his morning walks, most famously in the axe stunt (see below).

Speedos incident 
On 19 March 2007, during a campaign appearance for the New South Wales State Election, the then opposition leader Peter Debnam was confronted by Reucassel wearing nothing but Speedos and a baseball cap, making fun of Debnam's campaign appearances in the swimwear. When TV cameras remained focused on Reucassel rather than Mr Debnam, he said, "Sorry, I'm not Peter Debnam, he's over there. Just because I'm wearing this doesn't mean I'm Peter Debnam". Reucassel stuck around for the press conference but failed to draw a response from the opposition leader, and was again ignored when he went to shake Debnam's hand.

The axe stunt 
On 2 August 2006, Reucassel responded to a news story about a private school student who had hugged then-Prime Minister John Howard while holding a screwdriver during one of Howard's morning walks. To test the Prime Minister's security arrangements, he approached Howard during a morning walk and asked for a hug while holding a large plastic battle axe. Reucassel did receive the hug, but a later approach while holding a running chainsaw was not so successful. There was much debate surrounding whether to turn on the chainsaw and whether they would be shot at for doing this. Cut out from this segment was an unsuccessful attempt that took place between the axe and the chainsaw, in which Reucassel was holding a four-point-star mace.

Other work

In 2012 Reucassel was a patron of the Left Right Think-Tank, Australia's first independent and non-partisan youth think-tank.

In 2019 he began acting as one of the hosts of The Drum on ABC TV.

Television

CNNN – (2002–2003)
The Panel – (3 episodes) (2003, 04, 07)
The Chaser's War on Everything - (2006–2009)
Spy Shop – (1 episode) (2007)
Good News Week – (3 episodes) (2008–10)
Q&A – (3 episodes) (2008–11)
Top Gear Australia – (1 episode) (2010)
Balls of Steel Australia – (20 episodes – Host) (2011–2012)
You Have Been Watching – (1 episode) (2011)
The Joy of Sets – (1 episode) (2011)
The Silic & Lee Show at the Logies: Red Carpet Special 2012 – (1 episode) (2012)
The Checkout – (2013–2018)
War on Waste – series (2017–2018)
Fight for Planet A – series (2020)
Big Weather (and how to survive it) – series (2020)
Big Deal – two-part documentary series on the political lobbying industry (2021). Presented by Christiaan Van Vuuren, this was Reucassel's directorial debut.

References

External links

August 2006 Sydney Morning Herald article

1976 births
The Chaser members
Australian television writers
Australian television personalities
Triple J announcers
Australian male comedians
Australian people of South African descent
People from Adelaide
Living people
Sydney Law School alumni
Australian male television writers